Christian Burgess (born 7 October 1991) is an English professional footballer who plays as a defender for Belgian club Union SG.

Career

Youth career
Burgess began his career at Arsenal's academy and after he was released he went on to play with the youth and reserves teams at non-League Bishop's Stortford before deciding to study history at the University of Birmingham. Whilst in his second year university, Burgess earned a trial at Middlesbrough through a coach of the University's first team.

Middlesbrough
He impressed at Boro and he signed a two-year contract in July 2012. He made his professional debut on 4 May 2013 in a 2–0 defeat away at Sheffield Wednesday.

Hartlepool United
He joined Hartlepool United on loan in August 2013. The loan deal was extended until the end of the season in December.
Burgess scored his first goal in professional football in a 5–0 win for Hartlepool in a Football League Trophy game against Bradford City in September 2013.

Peterborough United
On 19 August 2014, Burgess signed on a month's loan for Peterborough United.
He completed a single game on loan, a 2–1 home defeat  by Sheffield United, before completing a permanent transfer on 21 August 2014. Burgess signed a four-year contract for an undisclosed fee.

Portsmouth
On 25 June 2015, Burgess signed for south coast club Portsmouth as part of the summer overhaul at the club by new manager Paul Cook.

He went on to make his debut on 11 July 2015, in a pre-season friendly against local Conference South club Havant & Waterlooville.

During the 2015–16 season, in which Portsmouth reached the play-off semi-finals, Burgess made 43 appearances in all competitions, partnered in most games by either Matthew Clarke or Adam Webster.

2016–17 season
Following a successful first campaign for Pompey, during which he established himself as the club's first-choice centre back, Burgess began the 2016–17 season as one of the team's central figures. In total, Burgess made 45 appearances and scored four goals over the course of the season, as Portsmouth won the League Two title. Burgess, along with teammate and fellow defender Enda Stevens, was named in the League Two team of the year; a reward for their part in Portsmouth's league-best defensive record.

2019–20 season
Burgess was awarded the EFL League One Player of the Month award in January 2020 and won the award for Portsmouth Player of the Season in the same year.

Union SG
Burgess turned down a contract extension at Portsmouth and on 7 July 2020 joined Belgian First Division B club Union SG, signing a three-year deal with the option of an additional year. He scored his first goal for the club in a 3–1 victory against Club NXT. At the end of the season RUSG were promoted, making it the second league title victory of Burgess' career. Burgess was awarded a place in the Team of the Season at the end of the season.

On 21 November 2021, Burgess scored two goals for the club in a 7-1 victory against Oostende.

Personal life
He earned a BA Hons in history part-time at Teesside University, having previously studied history at University of Birmingham before his move to Middlesbrough.

Career statistics

Honours
Portsmouth
EFL League Two: 2016–17
EFL Trophy: 2018–19

Union SG
Challenger Pro League: 2020–21
Belgian Pro League Runner-up: 2021-22

Individual
PFA Team of the Year: 2016–17 League Two
Football League Trophy, Player of the Round: February 2019
PFA EFL League One Player of the Month: January 2020
Portsmouth Player of the Season: 2019–20
Belgian First Division B Team of the Season: 2020–21

References

External links

1991 births
Living people
Footballers from Barking, London
Alumni of Teesside University
English footballers
Association football defenders
Arsenal F.C. players
West Ham United F.C. players
Middlesbrough F.C. players
Hartlepool United F.C. players
Peterborough United F.C. players
Portsmouth F.C. players
English Football League players
Alumni of the University of Birmingham
English expatriate footballers
Expatriate footballers in Belgium
English expatriate sportspeople in Belgium
Royale Union Saint-Gilloise players
Belgian Pro League players
Challenger Pro League players